Derek McWilliams (born 16 January 1966 in Broxburn) is a Scottish footballer, who played for Hibernian, Broxburn Athletic, Dundee, Stirling Albion, Falkirk, Dunfermline Athletic, Partick Thistle, Clydebank, East Stirlingshire, East Fife and Airdrieonians. McWilliams notably made a starting appearance in the 1991 Scottish League Cup Final during his spell with Dunfermline, facing his former club Hibernian.  He is currently the assistant manager of Broxburn Athletic.

Managerial career
In 2017, McWilliams was appointed Co-Manager of Livingston U20 squad along with Steve Pittman. The pair left the position in 2020.

McWilliams was appointed as Steve Pittman's assistant manager at Broxburn Athletic in January 2023.

References

External links

1966 births
Living people
Scottish footballers
Association football midfielders
Hibernian F.C. players
Dundee F.C. players
Stirling Albion F.C. players
Falkirk F.C. players
Dunfermline Athletic F.C. players
Partick Thistle F.C. players
East Stirlingshire F.C. players
Airdrieonians F.C. (1878) players
Scottish Football League players
Sportspeople from Broxburn, West Lothian
Footballers from West Lothian
Broxburn Athletic F.C. players
Clydebank F.C. (1965) players
East Fife F.C. players